Zoran Rendulić (born 22 May 1984) is a Serbian football coach and a former defender.

Club career
Rendulić played for on loan for SV Ried in Austria from January to June 2007 and then returned to Borac Čačak. On 24 June 2008, he joined the French club Grenoble which were promoted to Ligue 1.

In the summer of 2010 Rendulić signed one-year contract with FK Javor Ivanjica, where provides a great games. He scored two goals for this club. Following the contract with Javor expired, he agreed an offer to join K-League powerhouse Pohang Steelers in December 2011. The debut goal scored against Gamba Osaka in the 2012 AFC Champions League match.

In January 2015, Rendulić returned to Serbia and signed with FK Čukarički. After great half season with Čukarički, Rendulić was wanted by some of the best clubs in Serbia, but he finally signed with Red Star Belgrade.

Rendulić left FC Ordabasy in June 2017.

In summer 2017, Rendulić signed with Rad, and moved back to Čukarički in the mid-season.

Coaching career
In September 2021, he was hired as head coach of Rad in the Serbian First League.

Honours
Rendulić was elected as one of the "Top 11" Serbian Superleague players for the 2014–15 season.

Club
Pohang Steelers
Korean FA Cup: 2011–12

Čukarički
Serbian Cup: 2014–15

Red Star Belgrade
 Serbian SuperLiga: 2015–16

References

External links
Zoran Rendulić Stats at Utakmica.rs

1984 births
Living people
Footballers from Sarajevo
Serbs of Bosnia and Herzegovina
Association football central defenders
Bosnia and Herzegovina footballers
Serbian footballers
Serbia under-21 international footballers
FK Remont Čačak players
FK Borac Čačak players
SV Ried players
Grenoble Foot 38 players
FK Javor Ivanjica players
Pohang Steelers players
Shenyang Zhongze F.C. players
FK Čukarički players
Red Star Belgrade footballers
FC Ordabasy players
FK Rad players
First League of Serbia and Montenegro players
Second League of Serbia and Montenegro players
Austrian Football Bundesliga players
Ligue 1 players
Serbian SuperLiga players
K League 1 players
China League One players
Kazakhstan Premier League players
Serbian expatriate footballers
Expatriate footballers in Austria
Serbian expatriate sportspeople in Austria
Expatriate footballers in France
Serbian expatriate sportspeople in France
Expatriate footballers in South Korea
Serbian expatriate sportspeople in South Korea
Expatriate footballers in China
Serbian expatriate sportspeople in China
Expatriate footballers in Kazakhstan
Serbian expatriate sportspeople in Kazakhstan
Serbian football managers
FK Rad managers
Red Star Belgrade non-playing staff